Ahmed Mamdoh Abdel Salam (born 30 December 2000) is an English professional footballer who plays as a midfielder for Alfreton.

Career
A youth product of Hull City since the U11s, Salam joined Gainsborough Trinity on loan on 1 March 2020 for the rest of the 2019–20 season. Due to the COVID-19, Salam could only make 4 appearances before the season was postponed and returned to Hull City. Salam made his professional debut with Hull City in a 2–0 EFL Trophy win over Harrogate Town on 10 November 2020.
On 23 March 2021, Salam signed a new one-year contract with Hull City.

On 9 July 2021, Salam joined Linfield on a season-long loan.

It was announced by Alfreton Town on 25 September 2022 that Salam had signed a contract at the club following his release from Hull City. He made his debut before the club's official signing announcement on the 24 September 2022, featuring in the first half of a 1–0 victory over Brackley Town.

Personal life
Born in England, Salam is of Egyptian descent.

References

External links
 
 Hull City Profile

2000 births
Footballers from Kingston upon Hull
Living people
English footballers
English people of Egyptian descent
Association football midfielders
Hull City A.F.C. players
Gainsborough Trinity F.C. players
Linfield F.C. players
Alfreton Town F.C. players